Alona Fisher-Kamm has been the Israeli Ambassador to Serbia since 2016 and non-resident Ambassador to Montenegro.  Her tenure ended in 2020.

In September 2022, Fisher-Kamm was temporarily appointed head of the Israeli Liaison Office in Morocco amid investigations of sexual misconduct allegations against  David Govrin.

Education
PhD. Political Science, Tel Aviv University “Israel in the Intellectual Discourse of the Left in Europe – The Framing of Israel in the Media in Spain, France and Britain”
2010-2015 PhD. Student, Political Science, Tel Aviv University 
2009-2010 M.A. Studies, National Security College and Haifa University
1995-1998 M.A. Studies in Political Science, Tel Aviv University 
1986-1989 B.A. Studies in Political Science, Tel Aviv University

References

 
 

Ambassadors of Israel to Serbia
Israeli women ambassadors
Tel Aviv University alumni
University of Haifa alumni
Year of birth missing (living people)
Living people
Ambassadors to Montenegro
Israeli envoys to Morocco